Her Face Value is a 1921 American silent drama film directed by Thomas N. Heffron and written by Percy Heath based upon a story by Earl Derr Biggers. The film stars Wanda Hawley, Lincoln Plumer, Richard Rosson, T. Roy Barnes, Winifred Bryson, Donald MacDonald, and Harvey Clark. The film was released on October 13, 1921, by Paramount Pictures.

Plot
As described in a film magazine, chorus girl Peggy Malone (Hawley) marries the press agent of her company Jimmy Parsons (Barnes) and, after it disbands, retires to domestic life. She returns to the stage when her constantly visiting relatives cause a drifting apart of husband and wife. She subsequently joins a motion picture company, wins fame, is injured, and by the end of the film regains her husband and happiness.

Cast
Wanda Hawley as Peggy Malone
Lincoln Plumer as Pop Malone
Richard Rosson as Eddie Malone (credited as Dick Rosson)
T. Roy Barnes as Jimmy Parsons
Winifred Bryson as Laurette
Donald MacDonald as Martin Fox
Harvey Clark as F.B. Sturgeon
George Periolat as James R. Greenwood
Eugene Burr as Jack Darian
Ah Wing as Chinaman

References

External links

Film still at silenthollywood.com

1921 films
1920s English-language films
Silent American drama films
1921 drama films
Paramount Pictures films
American black-and-white films
Films directed by Thomas N. Heffron
American silent feature films
1920s American films